Agrupación Deportiva Sala 10 is a futsal club based in Zaragoza, city of the province of Zaragoza in the autonomous community of Aragon.

The club was founded in 1987 and her stadium is Pabellón Siglo XXI with  2,600 seaters.

The club has the sponsorship of D-Link .

Season to season

16 seasons in Primera División
5 seasons in Segunda División
3 seasons in Segunda División B

Current squad

Notable players
 Eka
 Santi Herrero
 Esteban Cejudo Guerrero

References

External links
Official website
Profile at LNFS.es

 
Futsal clubs in Spain
Sport in Zaragoza
Futsal clubs established in 1987
1987 establishments in Spain